Supernal Liberty is an album by Nana Mizuki. It was released on April 16, 2014 in three editions: a CD only edition and two limited CD+BD/DVD editions. Two limited editions includes two videos: photo shooting of the album and a special edition of the documentary Natsu no Kakera~ Mizuki Nana 2013 Natsu no Dekigoto.

Track listing
VIRGIN CODE
Lyrics: Hibiki
Composition: Noriyasu Agematsu (Elements Garden)
Arrangements: Junpei Fujita (Elements Garden)
GUILTY
Lyrics: Sayuri
Composition: Fujimatsu-ju, Ramon Riu
Arrangements: Takanori Tsunoda 
Appassionato (アパッショナート)
Lyrics: Nana Mizuki
Composition: Nana Mizuki
Arrangements: Hitoshi Fujima (Elements Garden)
TBS TV show "CDTV" opening theme for April and May
Egao no Yukue (笑顔の行方)
Lyrics: Miwa Yoshida
Composition: Masato Nakamura
Arrangements: Junpei Fujita (Elements Garden)
Cover version of a 1990 song by Japanese pop band, Dreams Come True  
A duet version of the song was featured in Junichi Inagaki's album, Otoko to Onna 3 -Two Hearts Two Voices- 
Antique Nachtmusik（アンティークナハトムジーク）
Lyrics: Shoko Fujibayashi
Composition: Takahiro Furukawa
Arrangements: Takahiro Furukawa
Fun Fun★People
Lyrics: Naho
Composition: h-wonder
Arrangements: h-wonder
FATE
Lyrics: Nana Mizuki
Composition: Jun Suyama
Arrangements: Jun Suyama
Vitalization -Aufwachen Form-
Lyrics: Nana Mizuki
Composition: Noriyasu Agematsu (Elements Garden)
Arrangements: Noriyasu Agematsu (Elements Garden), Daisuke Kikuta (Elements Garden)
Extended version of the opening theme for anime television series Senki Zesshō Symphogear G
Aishū Twilight (哀愁トワイライト)
Lyrics: Nana Mizuki
Composition: Hiroshi Usami
Arrangements: Hiroshi Usami
Setsuna Capacity (セツナキャパシティー)
Lyrics: Arata Maruta
Composition: Arata Maruta
Arrangements: Junpei Fujita (Elements Garden)
Ending theme for Tokyo FM Mizuki Nana M no Sekai
Ladyspiker
Lyrics: Shihori
Composition: Nakano Riyota
Arrangements: Nakano Riyota
Rock you baby!
Lyrics: Nana Mizuki
Composition: Naoya Endo
Arrangements: Tsunoda Takanori
Theme song for animeloLIVE! TV commercial
Million Ways＝One Destination
Lyrics: Kenichi Maeyamada
Composition: Kenji Ito, Kenichi Maeyamada
Arrangements: Kenji Ito
Theme song for iOS/Android RPG game Kai-ri-Sei Million Arthur
Bokura no Mirai (僕らの未来)
Lyrics: Toshiro Yabuki
Composition: Toshiro Yabuki
Arrangements: Toshiro Yabuki
 Ai no Hoshi -two hearts- (愛の星 -two hearts-)
Lyrics: Nana Mizuki, Eriko Yoshiki
Composition: Eriko Yoshiki
Arrangements: Hitoshi Fujima (Elements Garden), Mika Agematsu
Theme song for anime movie Space Battleship Yamato 2199 Chapter 7: Soshite Kan wa Iku
Remixed Version of the song 'Ai no Hoshi' (With added arrangements by Mika Agematsu)

Charts

Oricon Sales Chart (Japan)

References
Official website: NANA PARTY

2014 albums
Nana Mizuki albums